Plaza de España (Square of Spain)  may refer to:

In Spain 
 Plaça d'Espanya, Barcelona in Barcelona
 Plaça d'Espanya (Palma) in Palma, Mallorca
 Plaza de España, Madrid in Madrid
 Plaza de España (Pontevedra) in Pontevedra
 Plaza de España (Santa Cruz de Tenerife) in Santa Cruz de Tenerife
 Plaza de España, Seville in Seville
 Plaza de España (Cádiz) in Cádiz
 Plaza de España (A Coruña) in A Coruña
 Plaza de España (Valencia) in Valencia
 Plaza de España (Zaragoza) in Zaragoza

Elsewhere in Europe 
 Piazza di Spagna in Rome, Italy
 Praça de Espanha (Lisbon) in Lisbon, Portugal
 Piața Spaniei in Bucharest, Romania

Outside of Europe 
 Plaza España (Concepción) in Concepción, Chile
 Plaza de España (Santo Domingo) in the Zona Colonial in Santo Domingo, Dominican Republic
 Plaza de España (Manila) in Manila, the Philippines
 Plaza de España (Hagåtña) in Hagåtña, Guam, United States
 Plaza de España (Miami) in South Beach, Miami Beach, Florida, United States

See also 
 Plaza España metro station (disambiguation)
 List of city squares#Spain